Max Pievsky (born July 4, 1925) is an American former Democratic politician who served as a member of the Pennsylvania House of Representatives.

References

1925 births
Living people
Democratic Party members of the Pennsylvania House of Representatives